WDSF-LD, virtual channel 19 (UHF digital channel 36), is a low-powered Quest-affiliated television station licensed to Montgomery, Alabama, United States. The station is owned by DTV America Corporation, a television station group based in Sunrise, Florida.

History 
The station's construction permit was granted on May 17, 2011 under the callsign W19DS-D. The current WDSF-LD call letters were adopted on December 13, 2013.

On December 20, 2013, DTV America announced that WDSF, along with two other stations (WCZU-LD in Bowling Green, Kentucky and KPJO-LD in Joplin, Missouri), would become affiliates of MyNetworkTV, with programming from another service filling slots outside prime-time. While WCZU and KPJO chosen Antenna TV, WDSF opted for Doctor TV. (WCOV-TV is currently the Antenna TV affiliate for Central Alabama.) Doctor TV is also seen full-time on subchannel 19.2.

This would also be a return of MyNetworkTV to Central Alabama, since WRJM's disaffiliation from the network in 2009. Since then, most Central Alabama cable viewers watched MyNetworkTV via Birmingham affiliate WABM.

In 2015, the Sonlife Broadcasting Network became available on a third digital subchannel. It was replaced by Sony Pictures Television's GetTV movie network in December 2015. During that month, DrTV's full-time schedule on the second subchannel was replaced by FremantleMedia's Buzzr network. In 2017, the main channel's secondary affiliation was changed to AMGTV (and by 2018, Quest).

Digital channels
The station's digital signal is multiplexed:

References

External links

DTV America

DSF-LD
MyNetworkTV affiliates
Buzzr affiliates
Television channels and stations established in 2015
2015 establishments in Alabama
Innovate Corp.
Low-power television stations in the United States